John Fettiplace may refer to:

John Fettiplace (politician died 1580) (1527–1580), English MP from Appleton in Berkshire (now Oxfordshire)
John Fettiplace (politician died 1658) (1583–1658), English MP and royalist from Swinbrook in Oxfordshire
Sir John Fettiplace, 1st Baronet (died 1672), High Sheriff of Berkshire